Oslo Police Museum is a Police Museum in Oslo, Norway. The museum was established in 1902. Until 1973, it was known as the  Criminal Museum (Kriminalmuseet) . The museum documents the history of police work in the city of Oslo. The museum is housed at the Oslo Central police station (Sentrum politistasjon)  located at Hammersborggata 12 in the central Oslo neighborhood of St. Hanshaugen. Other police museum in Norway are maintained in Trondheim and Bergen.

References

Other sources
Kuijpers, Henk   (1986)  Kriminalmuseet  (Oslo: Hjemmet-Serieforl)  

1902 establishments in Norway
Museums in Oslo
Law enforcement museums in Norway